Wilhelm Türk (2 April 1871 – 20 May 1916) was an Austrian haematologist and professor of medicine at the University of Vienna.  He coined the term "lymphatic reaction" and the Türk cell is named for him.

References 

1871 births
1916 deaths
Hematologists